Margaret Murphy may refer to:

Margaret Murphy (writer) (born 1959), crime writer
Margaret "Digit" Murphy (born 1961), head coach of the Toronto Six of the National Women's Hockey League
Margaret "Peggy" Murphy (born 1930), American politician
Margaret Murphy (Paralympian), Australian Paralympic athlete
Margaret Murphy (Irish athlete), Irish Olympic hurdler
Margaret (Maggie) Murphy, Irish suffragette was one of the Cadiz sisters
Margaret Murphy (Sons of Anarchy), a character from the TV series Sons of Anarchy

See also
Murphy (surname)